Shingle Peak is the highest independent mountain completely within Lincoln County in Nevada, United States. The peak is part of the Egan Range and lies within the Humboldt-Toiyabe National Forest.

References 

Mountains of Nevada
Landforms of Lincoln County, Nevada
Humboldt–Toiyabe National Forest